Rokyni is an urban-type settlement in Lutsk Raion of Volyn Oblast in Ukraine. It is located where the Serna joins the Styr, in the basin of the Dnieper. Population:

Economy

Transportation
The closest railway station is in Lutsk.

The settlement is next to Highway M19 connecting Chernivtsi via Ternopil and Lutsk with Kovel.

References

Urban-type settlements in Lutsk Raion